Michael Neville (born 25 November 1960 in Dublin) is an Irish former footballer who played for Home Farm, Drogheda United, Shamrock Rovers, Derry City, and Shelbourne.

Neville started off with Home Farm where in three seasons he made 85 league appearances. He joined Drogheda United at the start of the 1982–83 season where he made 26 league appearances in his one season there.

Neville then moved to Milltown where he won four League of Ireland titles and three FAI Cups making 116 league appearances in five seasons. In total he made 179 appearances, including 6 appearances in European competition, scoring 20 goals. During this time he also for the League of Ireland XI in 6 qualifiers and two further Inter League games.

He then joined Derry City in 1988 and in his first season he won the domestic treble. He went on to make 66 league appearances in his two seasons there.

Neville signed for Shelbourne in 1990 and captained them to the league title in April 1992. The following year he captained Shels as they won the FAI Cup, at Lansdowne Road, for the first time in thirty years. Neville captained Shels to back-to-back FAI Cup wins in 1996 and 1997 as well as the League of Ireland Cup in 1995–96. He played 247 league games for Shels.

Neville was Director of Coaching at Shelbourne for eight years. While he with Shelbourne he helped relaunch Shelbourne Ladies F.C. in 2007. In June 2007 he was appointed as the FAI's Regional Development officer for County Louth.

Honours
League of Ireland: 6
 Shamrock Rovers – 1983–84, 1984–85, 1985–86, 1986–87
 Derry City – 1988–89
 Shelbourne – 1991–92

FAI Cup: 7
 Shamrock Rovers – 1985, 1986, 1987
 Derry City – 1989
 Shelbourne – 1993, 1996, 1997

League of Ireland Cup: 2
 Derry City – 1988–89
 Shelbourne – 1995–96
LFA President's Cup: 2
 Shamrock Rovers – 1984–85, 1987–88
Dublin City Cup
 Shamrock Rovers – 1983–84
SRFC Player of the Year:
 Shamrock Rovers – 1985–86

Sources 
 The Hoops by Paul Doolan and Robert Goggins

References

Association football defenders
Republic of Ireland association footballers
Home Farm F.C. players
Drogheda United F.C. players
Shamrock Rovers F.C. players
Derry City F.C. players
Shelbourne F.C. players
Association footballers from County Dublin
League of Ireland players
Living people
1960 births
League of Ireland XI players